William Kilmarnock (16 January 1922 – 7 June 2009) was a Scottish footballer who most notably captained Motherwell's 1952 Scottish Cup winning team. He also played for Airdrie and Irvine Meadow XI.

Kilmarnock played for Scotland in an unofficial wartime international and represented the Scottish Football League XI, but never received a full cap.

References

1922 births
2009 deaths
Footballers from Irvine, North Ayrshire
Scottish footballers
Association football fullbacks
Motherwell F.C. players
Airdrieonians F.C. (1878) players
Scottish Football League players
Irvine Meadow XI F.C. players
Scottish Football League representative players
Scotland wartime international footballers
Scottish Junior Football Association players